Joltin' Joe Roland is an album by jazz vibraphonist Joe Roland which was released on the Savoy label in 1955. The album was originally released as two 10-inch LPs recorded at three sessions, two from 1950 and 1954 released as Joe Roland Quartet and Symfonet and the other from 1954 released as Joe Roland Quartet.

Reception

Allmusic reviewer Scott Yanow stated: " He is paired in two 1954 quintets with either Freddie Redd (who plays conventional bop) and Wade Legge (sounding at his most eccentric) on piano. However the most memorable set is from 1950 for Roland is joined by guitar (Joe Puma), bass, drums and a string quartet. The writing for the strings (which is uncredited) is quite inventive and, although the strings do not solo, they sound very much like a jazz ensemble".

Track listing
All compositions by Wade Legge, except where noted.
 "Gene's Stew" – 5:24
 "Spice" – 4:26
 "Garrity's Flight" (Joe Roland) – 2:46
 "Indian Summer" (Victor Herbert, Al Dubin) – 2:50
 "Half Nelson" (Miles Davis) – 3:59
 "Love Is Just a Plaything" (Roland) – 2:27
 "Music House" – 3:08
 "Joyce's Choice" – 2:41
 "I've Got the World on a String" (Harold Arlen, Ted Koehler) – 4:39
 "Stephanie's Dance" (Freddie Redd) – 4:25
 "Sally Is Gone" (Roland) – 2:58
 "Dee Dee's Dance" (Denzil Best) – 2:44
 Recorded on January 17, 1950 (tracks 5, 6, 11 & 12), May 10, 1954 (tracks 3, 4, 9 & 10) and October 17, 1954 (tracks 1, 2, 7 & 8)

Personnel 
 Joe Roland – vibraphone
 Wade Legge, (tracks 1, 2, 7 & 8), Freddie Redd (tracks 3, 4, 9 & 10) – piano
 Joe Puma – guitar (tracks 5, 6, 11 & 12)
 Danny Martucci (tracks 1, 2, 7 & 8), Oscar Pettiford (tracks 3, 4, 9 & 10), Ismael Ugarte (tracks 5, 6, 11 & 12) – bass
 Harold Granowski, (tracks 5, 6, 11 & 12), Ron Jefferson (tracks 1–4 & 7–10) – drums
 Jules Modlin, Gus Oberstein – violin (tracks 5, 6, 11 & 12)
 Mike Bartun – viola (tracks 5, 6, 11 & 12)
 Sid Kassimir – cello (tracks 5, 6, 11 & 12)
 Paula Castle – vocals (track 6)

References 

1955 albums
Savoy Records albums
Joe Roland albums
Albums recorded at Van Gelder Studio
Albums produced by Ozzie Cadena